Crockett is an unincorporated community in Morgan County, Kentucky, United States.  It lies along Route 172 northeast of the city of West Liberty, the county seat of Morgan County.  Its elevation is 912 feet (278 m).  It has a post office with the ZIP code 41413.

A post office was established in 1900 and named for the postmaster Peter Fannin's son, David Crockett Fannin.

References

Unincorporated communities in Morgan County, Kentucky
Unincorporated communities in Kentucky